Hirilandhoo (Dhivehi: ހިރިލަންދޫ) is one of the inhabited islands of Thaa Atoll in the Maldives.

History
The island is one of the oldest recognised in the country. A box containing a copper plate of 9th century was found in the island.

Geography

Demography

Economy
Hirilandhoo is the most industrialized island in the atoll and region and has become a centre for boat crafting.

Fisheries is the traditional economic activity however with modern technology and modern boat crafting, fisheries industry had grown rapidly. Local entrepreneurs process value added products including vacuum dried fish in an immanence quantity to be sold in domestic market. The people live an average life, every one willing to work has some means of getting income. The average male gets 350mrf each day, as of 2020. The fishermen on the island are hard working. The annual catch for the islanders is increasing year by year.

Culture
The people of the island are famous for their recreational excellence over the other islands of the region. They have a history of music and dance.

References

Islands of the Maldives